Faith City School, formerly Faith Academy, is a state-integrated primary school in New Zealand.
With a roll of around 150 students Faith City School is the largest inter-denominational school in the Wanganui area. Teaching the New Zealand state curriculum from a Christian perspective, the school caters for students from New Entrants (Year 0) to Year 8.
The school was established and is still owned by Faith City Church (formerly Faith Community Church), a local Assemblies of God in New Zealand church.

History 
In 1978, Faith City Church purchased land in Wanganui, New Zealand, for the purpose of establishing a Christian education based school. In 1979 the church opened Faith Academy with a roll of 25 students using the Accelerated Christian Education curriculum, although this was later abandoned. In 1980 the school was officially registered with the New Zealand Ministry of Education. In 1995 Faith Academy became an integrated State School maintaining its Christian character and teaching emphasis.

In 2013, the school underwent a name change an rebranding from Faith Academy to Faith City School. This was partially due to the dated term 'Academy' as well as bringing the name in line with the proprietors Faith City Church.

References

External links 
 
 
 

Educational institutions established in 1979
Nondenominational Christian schools in New Zealand
Primary schools in New Zealand
Schools in Manawatū-Whanganui
1979 establishments in New Zealand